Come To Papa was a comedy podcast co-hosted by Tom Papa and Paul C. Morrissey. The show developed in 2013 out of a cancelled sitcom of the same name. The podcast is part of the All Things Comedy podcast network. Time Out magazine named Come To Papa the Best Podcast of 2013. Papa has also hosted a live version of the show, which was recorded for Sirius XM, with scripted sketches performed by comedians, stand-up sets and musical guests. Guests on the show have included Jerry Seinfeld, Mel Brooks, Rob Zombie, Carl Reiner, Dick Cavett, and Ray Romano. Cynthia Koury-Papa, Tom Papa's wife, has made guest appearances on the podcast for the 2012 Christmas episode, 2015 Live at Largo episode, and the 2017 SF Sketchfest episode. Tom Papa was busy publishing a book, hosting a new Food Network show, and doing a stand-up comedy tour in 2018 in addition to the podcast.

See also 

 Come to Papa (TV series)

References

External links 
 

Comedy and humor podcasts
All Things Comedy
2013 podcast debuts
Interview podcasts
2020 podcast endings
American podcasts